Henri Loÿs Delteil, also known as Léo Delteil (7 May 1869, Paris - 11 November 1927, Paris) was a French engraver, lithographer, illustrator, and art historian.

Biography 
His father was a librarian. He began as a student of the sculptor and engraver, François Théodore Devaulx. At the age of thirteen, he started collecting prints, with advice from the print merchant, Victor Prouté (1854-1918). At sixteen, he became an apprentice to the lithographer, Charles Pipard (1832-1916), as well as learning engraving techniques from, among others, Henri Boutet. In 1889, he held his first exhibition of etchings at the Salon, and would continue to have regular showings there until 1913. 

During his military service, from 1889 to 1892, he wrote some occasional articles about engravers; mostly in defense of his contemporaries, and critical of the government, which appeared to have little interest in acquiring prints. To ensure his future livelihood, he consulted with the relevant merchants and wrote their catalogues. In 1895, he founded a magazine, L'Estampe Moderne, featuring prints from amateurs as well as professionals, but it folded after only five issues. This was during a time when photographic means of reproduction were replacing traditional engraving.

In 1897, he founded a society for artists, "La Liane", which focused on prints created with manual processes, and organized exhibitions.

He was awarded a bronze medal at the Exposition Universelle of 1900. In 1906, the income he had earned as a professional consultant enabled him to publish an historiographic inventory series, Le Peintre-graveur illustré, which he produced until his death.

References

Further reading 
 Blandine Bouret, "L'Estampe moderne de Loÿs Delteil", In: Nouvelles de l'estampe, #96, December 1987, pp.4-12
 Le peintre-graveur illustré – Loÿs Delteil (31 vols., 1906–1926 Paris)

External links 

 Biographical timeline and critical essay by Sophie Bobet-Mezzasalma @ the Institut National d'Histoire de l'Art



French engravers
French lithographic artists
French art historians
1869 births
1927 deaths
19th-century engravers
20th-century engravers
French male non-fiction writers
20th-century French printmakers